Ian Francis Shirley (28 February 1940 – 20 January 2019) was New Zealand's first professor of public policy and an advocate for social justice. He established the Institute of Public Policy at Auckland University of Technology.

Academic career
Shirley was appointed as a lecturer in the Social Work Unit at Massey University in 1977, and promoted to senior lecturer in 1980. In 1982, he succeeded Merv Hancock as the director of the unit. He moved to the Auckland University of Technology in 2000, where he established the Institute of Public Policy, and also served as pro vice-chancellor.

Social policy
Shirley advised on the Auckland super city.

Later life and death
Shirley retired from Auckland University of Technology in 2016, and was accorded the title of professor emeritus. He died aged 78 on 20 January 2019.

References

1940 births
2019 deaths
People from Kaiapoi
Academic staff of the Auckland University of Technology
Academic staff of the Massey University